Trenchcoat in Paradise is a 1989 American made-for-television mystery-crime film directed by Martha Coolidge and starring Dirk Benedict, Sydney Walsh, Catherine Oxenberg, Michelle Phillips and Bruce Dern.

Plot
Eddie Mazda (Dirk Benedict) is a hard-nosed private investigator originally from Jersey City, New Jersey. After working a job for a widow named Nan Thompson (Amy Yasbeck), he soon after is confronted by mob boss Dom Gellatti (Ralph Drischell), the man who killed Mrs. Thompson's husband. Having already ransacked Mazda's film studio for any incriminating pictures against him for fear of federal prosecutions, Gellatti gives Eddie the chance to back down by forcing him to leave Jersey City and never come back, or else. After gathering some of his possessions, leaving a phone message to his ex-wife Vicky, and leaving his pet goldfish with the next-door neighbor and her cat, Mazda is escorted by two of Gellatti's goons to the airport and given a plane ticket to Chicago and some money; instead, he decides to go to Hawaii, taking with him film negatives that he managed to hide from the mobsters.

Cast
 Dirk Benedict as Eddie Mazda
 Sydney Walsh as Mona Williams
 Catherine Oxenberg as Lisa Duncan
 Michelle Phillips as Suzanna Hollander
 Jeremy Slate as Robert Graham
 Kim Zimmer as Claire Hollander
 Bruce Dern as John Hollander
 Vincent Guastaferro as Carmen Nunzo Jr.
 Keone Young as Bob Kanuka
 Amy Yasbeck as Nan Thompson
 Montana Joe The Cat as Neighbor's Cat

References

External links

1989 television films
1989 films
1980s mystery films
1980s crime films
American mystery films
American crime films
CBS network films
Films directed by Martha Coolidge
Films scored by John Debney
1980s American films